Betty Loren-Maltese is a convicted felon and the former town president of Cicero, Illinois. She is a member of the Republican Party  and received national attention for her role in an insurance scam which robbed the town of $12 million.

Biography
Loren-Maltese was born in Baton Rouge, Louisiana, but she was raised in the Chicago area. After working as a waitress, realtor, and newspaper publisher, she became active in the politics of Cicero, a suburb adjacent to the west side of Chicago.

Her husband, Frank Maltese, was the Cicero township assessor and mid-level mobster; among other duties, he was the driver for Cicero town president Henry Klosak. Frank Maltese was also a bookmaker for the mob and died in 1991.  In 1993, Loren-Maltese became town president following the death of Henry Klosak.

Loren-Maltese was well liked by many residents for her attempts at community improvement. She was particularly well known for her efforts in helping senior citizens with free services.

In 2002 she was found guilty of helping to steal $12 million of the city's funds in an insurance scam. She was sentenced to eight years in a federal prison in California, and designated Prisoner #13706-424. She was released on February 26, 2010.

References

External links

This American Life: Cicero

Politicians from Baton Rouge, Louisiana
Politicians from Cook County, Illinois
People from Cicero, Illinois
Living people
Politicians convicted of racketeering
Politicians convicted of mail and wire fraud
Illinois politicians convicted of crimes
Illinois Republicans
American people of Lithuanian descent
Year of birth missing (living people)
Mayors of places in Illinois
Women in Illinois politics